"Letters Have No Arms" is a country music song written by Ernest Tubb and Arbie Gibson, sung by Tubb, and released on the Decca label. In February 1950, it reached No. 2 on the country juke box chart. It spent 17 weeks on the charts and was the No. 20 juke box country record of 1950.

See also
 Billboard Top Country & Western Records of 1950

References

Ernest Tubb songs
1950 songs